JoJo is an American Pop/R&B singer, songwriter and actress. Her first concert tour was across North America, where she performed at nine malls, starting at Atlanta's Northlake Mall and ending at South Shore Plaza in her home state. Later that year JoJo embarked on her first European Tour with Usher for Usher's Truth Tour where she was the opening act.

In 2011, she joined the Joe Jonas & Jay Sean Tour where she performed 19 shows Across North America as their opening act.

Tours

Opening act

Special Guest

Promo tours

Charity Concerts

References

External links
 JoJo's official website

JoJo (singer)
Jojo